Hortigüela is a municipality located in the province of Burgos, Castile and León, Spain. According to the 2004 census (INE), the municipality has a population of 126 inhabitants.

Main sights 
 Ruins of the 10th-century Benedictine Monastery of San Pedro de Arlanza.
 Fuente Azul, an upwelling which has the deepest sump in Spain (-135 m.)

References 

Municipalities in the Province of Burgos